Methylammonium tin halides are solid compounds with perovskite structure and a chemical formula of CH3NH3SnX3, where X = I, Br or Cl. They are promising lead-free alternatives to lead perovskites as photoactive semiconductor materials. Tin-based perovskites have shown excellent mobility in transistors  which gives them an opportunity to be explored more for solar cell applications.

Tin halide perovskites, despite being regarded as semiconductors, often display metallic-like behavior due to the inadvertent and/or spontaneous hole carrier doping resulting from the easy oxidation of Sn2+ to Sn4+.

See also
Perovskite solar cell
Methylammonium halide
Methylammonium lead halide
Tin-based perovskite solar cells

References 

Solar power
Perovskites
Methylammonium compounds
C